Viljam Johansson (18 April 1887 – 8 August 1931) was a Finnish long-distance runner. He competed in the men's 5000 metres at the 1912 Summer Olympics.

References

1887 births
1931 deaths
Athletes (track and field) at the 1912 Summer Olympics
Finnish male long-distance runners
Olympic athletes of Finland
Place of birth missing
Olympic cross country runners